Siccia quilimania is a moth in the  family Erebidae. It was described by Strand in 1922. It is found in Mozambique.

References

Natural History Museum Lepidoptera generic names catalog

Endemic fauna of Mozambique
Moths described in 1922
Nudariina
Moths of Sub-Saharan Africa
Lepidoptera of Mozambique